I'yad and Iyad may refer to:

People

Given name
I'yad Hutba (born 1987), Israeli footballer
Iyad Mando, (born 1978), Syrian footballer